Gopalrao Deshmukh Marg is an arterial road in the city of  Mumbai, India, passing through the affluent Cumballa Hill neighbourhood. The road is named after a social activist and first Mayor of Bombay (present-day Mumbai) after India's Independence, Dr. Gopalrao Deshmukh.

Details
It is said to be resting on what was first known as Padam Hill. Its former name, Pedder Road, was named after Mr. W. G. Pedder, Municipal Commissioner (1879) who was in the Bombay Civil Service, 1855–1879, and on his retirement was appointed Secretary to the Revenue and Commerce Department at the India Office. Even today as with a very large number of Mumbai's roads it is commonly referred to by its former name (usually incorrectly spelled as Peddar).

The road begins at the well-known intersection of Kemp's Corner and extends down Cumballa Hill past the Mahalaxmi temple to the Haji Ali intersection. The very first flyover built in Mumbai connected Hughes Road to Gopalrao Deshmukh Marg at Kemp's Corner.

Dr. Gopalrao Deshmukh was the first President of the Indian Medical Association and the first Mayor of Bombay after independence. He lived on Pedder Road in a palatial home that later made way for a multi-story building. A leading citizen of Mumbai, he was the personal friend of Sir Jamshetji Kanga. Of his notable descendants one can name Dr Uday Dokras, international author of Human Resource books, who is his grandson.

Pedder Road came to be renamed in his honour. The road ends in a flyover which was known as the Kemp's Corner flyover before but has been rechristened as "Dr Gopalrao Deshmukh Uddanpul(Flyover)".

In February 2000, Indian Institute of Technology, Bombay carried out a study on traffic in the area which found that 94,000 vehicles used the route every day at that time. The same study also found that the average number of cars owned by a family living in Gopalrao Deshmukh Marg was 2.3.

Landmarks
 Jaslok Hospital (inaugurated 6 July 1973)
 Sophia College
 Jindal House
 Residence Quarters of the Income Tax Department
 Russian Cultural Centre
 Films Division of India
 Antilia (building)

Famous residents
 Asha Bhosale, singer
 Guru Dutt, actor
 Lata Mangeshkar, singer
 Madhav Apte, former cricketer
 Madan Mohan, music director
 Madhubala, actress and producer
 Kalyanji-Anandji, music director

References

Roads in Mumbai
Neighbourhoods in Mumbai